The 2010 Idaho Vandals football team represented the University of Idaho in the 2010 NCAA Division I FBS football season. The Vandals, led by fourth-year head coach Robb Akey, were members of the Western Athletic Conference (WAC) and played their home games at the Kibbie Dome, an indoor facility on campus in Moscow, Idaho. They finished the season 6–7 overall and 3–5 in WAC play.

Schedule

Idaho's home attendance in 2010 was 76,379 for six games, an average of 12,730 per game. The maximum was 16,453 for the Boise State game on November 12. The minimum was 8,011 for San Jose State game on December 4.

NFL Draft
Three Vandals were selected in the 2011 NFL Draft, the most taken in one draft since 1972. In that 1972 NFL Draft,which lasted 17 rounds (442 selections), three Vandals were taken from the 1971 Vandal team that went 8-3.The third Vandal went in the 17th round at #428; the 2011 Draft was just seven rounds (254 selections).

List of Idaho Vandals in the NFL Draft

References

Idaho
Idaho Vandals football seasons
Idaho Vandals football